KKCO (channel 11) is a television station in Grand Junction, Colorado, United States, affiliated with NBC and Telemundo. It is owned by Gray Television alongside low-power dual ABC/CW+ affiliate KJCT-LP (channel 8). Both stations share studios on Blichmann Avenue in Grand Junction, while KKCO's transmitter is located at the Black Ridge Electronics Site at the Colorado National Monument west of the city.

History
KKCO signed on the air on May 5, 1996. Prior to then, some NBC programs had been available by way of off-hours clearance on KREX-TV (channel 5). The network's full schedule was available only on cable from the network's Denver affiliates (KCNC-TV from the early 1980s until September 1995, then KUSA for most of the 1995–96 season). Its sign-on made Grand Junction one of the last markets in the country with full service from the Big Three networks.

KKCO was owned by Eagle III Broadcasting L.L.C. from 1996 to 2005, when current owner Gray Television bought the station.

Soon after signing on, KKCO's newscast shot to the top of the ratings, past longer-established KREX and KJCT. It has remained atop the ratings for most of the time since then.

On September 18, 2006, its DT2 subcarrier became the area's new affiliate for The CW. Sometime in late 2008, KKCO-DT2 dropped the CW affiliation when KJCT-DT3 picked up The CW. KKCO-DT2 relaunched in December 2012 when it affiliated with MeTV. KKCO has been digital-only since February 17, 2009. On December 15, 2014, KKCO launched a new third subchannel affiliated with Telemundo after KJCT's former intellectual unit moved to KKHD-LP, which formerly carried Telemundo.

News operation
KKCO currently carries 24½ hours of local news a week, with 4½ hours each weekday and two hours each on Saturdays and Sundays. With the exception of the 5 and 6 p.m. newscasts, KKCO's newscasts are also seen on sister KJCT-LD.

Notable alumni
 Butch McCain – chief weather anchor; weeknights at 5:30, 6 (KKCO-DT2 MeTV) and 10 p.m.

Technical information

Subchannels
The station's digital signal is multiplexed:

Translators

References

External links

NBC network affiliates
MeTV affiliates
Telemundo network affiliates
Television channels and stations established in 1996
1996 establishments in Colorado
KCO
Gray Television